Latvijas Finieris is the leading plywood and its products' manufacturer in Baltic States. The company also is active in forest management, logging and the production of synthetic resins and phenol films.

Patron of the University of Latvia.
Latvijas Finieris is a bronze patron of the University of Latvia Foundation. In 2001, he donated to the installation of a memorial stone to the patron of the University of Latvia Kristaps Morbergs in Bukaiši, in his native house "Lielstrikaiši".

History

Table of production sites

References

External links
Official website
Plywood Sheets

Forest products companies
Companies of Latvia
Manufacturing companies established in 1992
Plywood
Latvian companies established in 1992